Religious exclusivism, or religious exclusivity, is the doctrine or belief that only one particular religion or belief system is true. This is in contrast to religious pluralism.

Buddhism
Some attempts have been made to portray Buddhism in an exclusivistic framework by pointing out that the implication that those who do not accept the teachings of the Buddha, such as the Eightfold Path, are destined to repeat the cycle of suffering through endless reincarnations; while those who practice the true way can reach enlightenment. Neo-Buddhist groups sometimes consider their tradition the true path to enlightenment and engage in strong evangelical efforts to influence those they consider to be in darkness. Several sects associated with Nichiren Buddhism may be included in this category.

However, many followers of Eastern religions are not exclusivist. For example, there are millions of Buddhists who would also consider themselves to follow Confucianism or Taoism.

Christianity

Some Christians have argued that religious pluralism is an invalid or self-contradictory concept. Maximal forms of religious pluralism claim that all religions are equally true, or that one religion can be true for some and another for others. Most Christians hold this idea to be logically impossible from the Principle of contradiction. The two largest Christian branches, the Catholic Church and the Eastern Orthodox Church, both claim to be the "one true church" and that "outside the true Church there is no salvation"; Protestantism however, which has many different denominations, has no consistent doctrine in this regard, and has a variety of different positions regarding religious pluralism.

A number of Christian denominations assert that they alone represent the one true church – the church to which Jesus gave his authority in the Great Commission. The Catholic Church, the Eastern Orthodox Church, the Oriental Orthodox communion and the Assyrian Church of the East each understands itself as the one and only original church. The claim to the title of the "one true church" relates to the first of the Four Marks of the Church mentioned in the Nicene Creed: "one, holy, catholic, and apostolic church".  The concept of schism somewhat moderates the competing claims between some churches – one can potentially repair schism. For example, the Catholic and Eastern Orthodox Churches each regard the other as schismatic rather than heretical.

Similarly, a number of groups, such as the Church of Jesus Christ of Latter-day Saints (LDS Church), view apostolic succession as an essential element in constituting the one true church, arguing that it has inherited the spiritual, ecclesiastical and sacramental authority and responsibility that Jesus Christ gave to the Apostles. Other groups, such as Iglesia ni Cristo, believe in a last-messenger doctrine, where no such succession takes place. A few believe they have restored the original church, in belief or in practice.  The Seventh-day Adventist Church is regarded to be the one true church in the sense of being a faithful remnant.

Many mainstream Protestants regard all baptized Christians as members of a "spiritual Christian Church" which is not visible or institutional; this belief is sometimes referred to by the theological term "invisible church". Some other Christians, such as Anglicans of Anglo-Catholic churchmanship, espouse a version of branch theory which teaches that the true Christian Church comprises Anglican, Eastern Orthodox,  Old Catholic, Oriental Orthodox, Scandinavian Lutheran, and Roman Catholic branches.

Hinduism
The Bhagavad Gita warns against exclusivism:यत्तु कृत्स्नवदेकस्मिन्कार्ये सक्तमहैतुकम्।

अतत्त्वार्थवदल्पं च तत्तामसमुदाहृतम्

But that which clings blindly to one idea as if it were all, without logic, truth or insight, that has its origin in Darkness.

— Bhagavad Gita, 18:22

Islam

Muslims believe that Islam is the original and primordial faith, or fitrah, that was revealed to Muhammad. Muslims maintain that previous messages and revelations have been partially changed or corrupted over time and consider the Quran to be the unaltered and the final revelation from Allah. Religious concepts and practices include the five pillars of Islam, which are basic concepts and obligatory acts of worship, and following Islamic law, which touches on virtually every aspect of life and society, encompassing everything from banking and welfare, to warfare and the environment.

Islam began its history with an exclusivist attitude toward polytheist religions, but an inclusivist attitude toward monotheists, including Christians and Jews. Believers in the oneness of God were given the status of dhimmi, conferring on them certain rights, including the right to practice their religions openly and not to be pressured to accept Islam. 

In practice, however, neither the inclusion of Jews and Christians nor militant exclusivism toward "pagans" was always practiced. Trinitarian Christians were accused of idolatry because of their veneration of icons and were also sometimes treated as polytheists because of the doctrines of the Trinity and the Incarnation. Jews generally fared better than Christians under Islamic rule. Jews and Christians are viewed largely favorably as compared to any other religion.

The basic attitude of Islam toward other religions remains unchanged today, and certain Islamic nations, such as Saudi Arabia and Iran, are more exclusivistic toward other religions than are others, such as Indonesia and Egypt.

Islam does accept sincere Jews, Christians, and Sabians as people "of the Book" along with Muslims.

Judaism
Most Jews believe that the God of Abraham is the one true God. The Jews believe the God of Abraham entered into a covenant with the ancient Israelites, marking them as his Chosen People, giving them a mission to spread the concept of monotheism. Jews do not consider their chosenness to be a mark of superiority to other nations, but a responsibility to be an example of behavior for other nations to emulate.

References

Further reading
 Corney, Peter, and Kevin Giles. Exclusivism and the Gospel. Kew, Vic: St. Hilary's Anglican Church, 1997. OCLC 38819137
 Dickson, Kwesi A. Uncompleted Mission: Christianity and Exclusivism. Orbis Books, 1991. 
 Griffiths, Paul. Problems of Religious Diversity. Exploring the Philosophy of Religion. Blackwell Publishers, 2001. 
 Küng, Hans. Christianity and the World Religions: Paths of Dialogue with Islam, Hinduism, and Buddhism. Doubleday, 1986. 
 Quinn, Philip, and Kevin Meeker. The Philosophical Challenge of Religious Diversity. Oxford University Press, 1999. 

Christian terminology
Religious studies